Yumari González Valdivieso (born June 13, 1979) is a Cuban professional road and track cyclist. She competed at the 2008 and 2012 Summer Olympics in the Women's road race.

Career 
Born in Sancti Spíritus, González won the 500-metre time trial at the 2002 Pan American Cycling Championships, setting a new Pan American record with a time of 34.647 seconds. She also won silver medals in the sprint and the keirin.

Major results

Track

1998
 Central American and Caribbean Games
1st  500m time trial
2nd  Sprint
1999
 Pan American Games
3rd  500m time trial
3rd  Sprint
2002
 UCI Track Cycling World Cup Classics
1st  Keirin, Monterrey
3rd  500m time trial, Cali
 Pan American Track Championships
1st  500m time trial
2nd  Sprint
2nd  Keirin
2003
 Pan American Games
3rd  500m time trial
3rd  Keirin
2004
 Pan American Track Championships
1st  Scratch
2nd  500m time trial
2nd  Keirin
2nd  Sprint
2005
 Pan American Track Championships
1st  Scratch
3rd  500m time trial
3rd  Points race
2006
 1st  Scratch, Pan American Track Championships
 Central American and Caribbean Games
1st  Keirin
2nd  Points race
2nd  Scratch
2007
 1st  Scratch, UCI Track Cycling World Championships
 2007–08 UCI Track Cycling World Cup Classics
1st  Scratch, Sydney
3rd  Scratch, Beijing
3rd  Team pursuit, Beijing
 2nd  Team sprint, Pan American Track Championships
 2006–07 UCI Track Cycling World Cup Classics
3rd  Team sprint, Los Angeles
3rd  Scratch, Manchester
2008
 2008–09 UCI Track Cycling World Cup Classics, Cali
1st  Team pursuit
2nd  Points race
2nd  Scratch
 2nd  Scratch, UCI Track Cycling World Championships
2009
 UCI Track Cycling World Championships
1st  Scratch
2nd  Points race
 2009–10 UCI Track Cycling World Cup Classics
2nd  Points race, Manchester
3rd  Scratch, Cali
2010
 Pan American Track Championships
1st  Scratch
2nd  Team pursuit
 2nd  Scratch, UCI Track Cycling World Championships
2011
 2nd  Team pursuit, Pan American Games
2013
 Copa Cuba de Pista
1st Team pursuit (with Yudelmis Domínguez, Marlies Mejías and Arlenis Sierra)
3rd Points race
2014
 1st  Team pursuit, Central American and Caribbean Games (with Yudelmis Domínguez, Marlies Mejías and Arlenis Sierra)
 2nd  Team pursuit, Pan American Track Championships (with Yudelmis Domínguez, Yoanka González and Marlies Mejías)
 Copa Cuba de Pista
2nd Omnium
2nd Scratch

Road

2005
 3rd  Road race, Pan American Road Championships
 3rd Time trial, National Road Championships
2006
 1st  Road race, Pan American Road Championships
 2nd  Road race, Central American and Caribbean Games
2007
 1st  Road race, Pan American Games
 2nd  Road race, Pan American Road Championships
2008
 1st  Road race, Pan American Road Championships
 National Road Championships
1st  Road race
2nd Time trial
2011
 2nd  Road race, Pan American Games
2012
 1st  Road race, Pan American Road Championships
 1st  Road race, National Road Championships
2014
 2nd  Road race, Central American and Caribbean Games
 3rd Road race, National Road Championships
2015
 3rd  Road race, Pan American Road Championships
 3rd Time trial, National Road Championships
 8th Road race, Pan American Games
2016
 1st  Time trial, National Road Championships
2019
 9th Road race, Pan American Games

References

External links 
 
 
 
 
 
 
 

1979 births
Living people
Cuban female cyclists
Cuban track cyclists
UCI Track Cycling World Champions (women)
Olympic cyclists of Cuba
Cyclists at the 2008 Summer Olympics
Cyclists at the 2012 Summer Olympics
Pan American Games medalists in cycling
Pan American Games gold medalists for Cuba
Cyclists at the 1999 Pan American Games
Cyclists at the 2003 Pan American Games
Cyclists at the 2007 Pan American Games
Cyclists at the 2011 Pan American Games
Cyclists at the 2015 Pan American Games
Cyclists at the 2019 Pan American Games
Medalists at the 2003 Pan American Games
Medalists at the 2007 Pan American Games
Medalists at the 2011 Pan American Games
Central American and Caribbean Games medalists in cycling
Central American and Caribbean Games gold medalists for Cuba
Central American and Caribbean Games silver medalists for Cuba
Competitors at the 1998 Central American and Caribbean Games
Competitors at the 2006 Central American and Caribbean Games
People from Sancti Spíritus
21st-century Cuban women
Competitors at the 2014 Central American and Caribbean Games